Vergani is an Italian surname. Notable people with the surname include:

 Andrea Vergani (born 1997), Italian swimmer
 Beniamino Vergani (1863–1927), Italian chess player
 Edoardo Vergani (born 2001), Italian football player
 Giuseppe Vergani (18th century), Italian writer
 Lorenzo Vergani (born 1993), Italian track hurdler
 Paolo Vergani (1753–1820), Italian political economist 

Italian-language surnames